The 1996–97 Colorado Buffaloes Men's basketball team represented the University of Colorado in the 1996–97 season. Led by first-year head coach Ricardo Patton, and sophomore Guard Chauncey Billups, the Buffaloes made the NCAA tournament despite only having won nine games the previous year. Billups, was particularly impressive this particular season. Billups earned Big 12 Player of the year honors as well as all-American honors. Following this season, Billups would declare his eligibility for the NBA draft, being selected third overall in 1997. Following his career end, Billups' number would be retired by the Buffaloes. As Head Coach of the Buffaloes, Patton had been appointed after having been named interim head coach the prior season. Patton would stay head coach of the Buffaloes until 2007.

Roster

Schedule and results

|-
!colspan=9 style=| Non-conference regular season

|-
!colspan=9 style=| Big 12 Regular Season

|-
!colspan=9 style=| Big 12 Tournament

|-
!colspan=9 style=| NCAA Tournament

Postseason Schedule
Big 12 Tournament
Quarterfinal Vs. Oklahoma, Kemper Arena, Kansas City, MO - L, 41-55
NCAA Tournament
First Round Vs. Indiana, Lawrence Joel Veterans Memorial Coliseum, Winston-Salem, NC - W, 80-62
Round of 32 Vs. North Carolina, Lawrence Joel Veterans Memorial Coliseum, Winston-Salem, NC - L, 56-73

Rankings

Awards and honors
Chauncey Billups – First-team All-Big 12, Consensus Second-team All-American

Team players in the 1997 NBA draft

References

Colorado Buffaloes men's basketball seasons
Colorado
Colorado